Deutz-Allis was formed when Deutz-Fahr of Germany, part of KHD, purchased the agricultural assets of the Allis-Chalmers corporation in 1985.

Deutz-Allis was eventually sold to the Allis-Gleaner Corporation, or AGCO), in 1990. Deutz-Allis tractors and equipment were renamed in North America to be AGCO-Allis, but continued in South America until 2001, when the South American operations were renamed AGCO-Allis.
In Argentina, was made the Deutz-Allis 5.125 L and the Deutz-Allis 5.190.

In North America, Deutz-Allis tractors carried both the traditional Deutz-green color, and Allis-orange color.  In South America they were Deutz-green.

References

External links 
 http://www.tractordata.com/farm-tractors/tractor-brands/deutzallis/deutzallis-tractors.html

AGCO
Allis-Chalmers Manufacturing Company
SAME Deutz-Fahr
Agriculture companies of Germany